Paje may refer to:

Places
Paje, Botswana
Paje, Zanzibar, Tanzania
Pajé River, Ceará, Brazil

People
Lee Paje (born 1980), Filipino visual artist
Ramón Paje (born 1960), Filipino civil servant